Paposh Nagar Graveyard is one of the oldest graveyards located in Paposh Nagar, Karachi, Pakistan.

In February 2017, Karachi Metropolitan Corporation has banned burial in Paposh Nagar Graveyard due to lack of availability of space. But despite the ban, people are illegally burying corpses.

Notable burials
 Ibn-e-Safi (1928–1980), fiction writer, novelist and poet of Urdu
 Mulla Wahidi (1888–1976), writer and journalist
 Ibn-e-Insha (1927–1978), writer
 Mohsin Bhopali (1932–2007), poet
 Mufti Rashid Ahmad Ludhianvi (1922–2002), Islamic scholar
 Dr. Mohammad Ali Shah (1946–2013), orthopaedic surgeon
 Ghulam Farid Sabri (1945–2011), Qawwali singer
 Maqbool Ahmed Sabri (1930–1994), Qawwali singer
 Amjad Sabri (1976–2016), Qawwali singer
 Zaheen Tahira (1949–2019), film and television actress, producer and director
 B. M. Kutty (1930–2019), journalist, public servant, politician
 Quraish Pur (1932–2013),  scholar, writer, novelist, columnist and media expert

References

Cemeteries in Karachi
Karachi Central District